Fudbalski klub Jedinstvo Brčko (Serbian Cyrillic: Фудбалски клуб Јединство Бpчкo) is a professional association football club from the city of Brčko that is situated in the Brčko District, Bosnia and Herzegovina. The club competes in the First League of the Republika Srpska, a second-tier competition in Bosnia and Herzegovina. The club plays its home matches on the Gradski stadion (City Stadium) in Brčko, which has a capacity of 16,000 seats.

Jedinstvo used to compete in the Yugoslav Second League before the break-up of SFR Yugoslavia. They were promoted to the second league as champions of the third league in 2015.

Honours

Domestic

League
Second League of the Republika Srpska:
 Winners (2): 2016–17 , 2018–19

Cups
 Republika Srpska Cup:
 Winners (2): 2002–03, 2004–05

Club seasons
Source:

Players

Current squad

Former players
For the list of former players with Wikipedia article, please see :Category:FK Jedinstvo Brčko players.

Historical list of managers

 Ibrahim Biogradlić
 Miralem Ibrahimović
 Vlado Zelenika
 Tomislav Manojlović
 Radomir Jovičić
 Nebojša Vučićević (2002)
 Milenko Radić
 Dževad Bekić
 Milko Djurovski (2010-2011)
 Drago Vujatović
 Savo Obradović
 Nikola Nikić
 Dragiša Krajšumović
 Miroslav Milanović
 Bambi Gusterovic
 Vidoje Zarić (2017)
 Nusret Muslimović (2020)
 Zoran Brković (2020-2021)

References

External links
 Club at BiHsoccer.

FK Jedinstvo Brčko
Association football clubs established in 1919
Football clubs in Bosnia and Herzegovina
Football clubs in Republika Srpska
Football clubs in Yugoslavia
Brčko District
1919 establishments in Bosnia and Herzegovina